Barbetti is an Italian surname that may refer to the following notable people:
Cesare Barbetti (1930–2006), Italian actor and voice actor
 Paltemio Barbetti (born 1989), Italian football midfielder
Rinaldo Barbetti (1830-c.1904), Italian sculptor, designer and illustrator

Italian-language surnames